Trine Elvstrøm-Myralf (born 6 March 1962) is a Danish sailor. She competed at the 1984 Summer Olympics and the 1988 Summer Olympics.

References

External links
 

1962 births
Living people
Danish female sailors (sport)
Olympic sailors of Denmark
Sailors at the 1984 Summer Olympics – Tornado
Sailors at the 1988 Summer Olympics – Tornado
Sportspeople from Copenhagen